The Charlottetown Islanders are a junior ice hockey team in the Quebec Major Junior Hockey League (QMJHL). Based in Charlottetown, Prince Edward Island, Canada, the Islanders play their home games at the Eastlink Centre, which has 3,717 arena seats.

History

Originally located in Montreal, Quebec, and called the Montreal Rocket, the team relocated to Charlottetown, Prince Edward Island, in 2003. They were named after the legendary Maurice Richard (known as the Rocket) of the Montreal Canadiens, and their team crest depicted his number, 9.

In their first season on PEI, the Rocket won 40 regular season games and made it to the second round of the playoffs, where they lost in six games to the Moncton Wildcats led by goalie Corey Crawford.

After that, the franchise would not win a playoff series for another 11 years.

Beginning in the 2013–14 season, the Rocket rebranded as the Charlottetown Islanders.

President and governor Serge Savard Jr. confirmed on April 17, 2013, that the QMJHL had contacted the Rocket two days earlier with a proposal to buy the struggling franchise. Savard said he intended to accept the offer, somewhere in the area of $3.5 million, unless he was able to find a local buyer or buyers for the team. Savard said league commissioner Gilles Corteau had given him until April 26 to secure a buyer. One interested group intended to relocate the team to Sorel, Quebec.

However, an ownership group led by Geoff Boyle agreed to purchase the team, ensuring its future in Charlottetown for 2013–14 and beyond. The new Islanders logo and colour scheme was unveiled on May 27.

In the 2014–15 season, for the first time since the franchise's inaugural season as the PEI Rocket, the Charlottetown Islanders advanced to the second round of the QMJHL playoffs, after defeating the Sherbrooke Phoenix 4–2 in the first round. However, in the second round, they were eliminated by the Quebec Remparts 4–0.

On June 29, 2015, the Islanders hired Jim Hulton as head coach after Gordie Dwyer was relieved of his duties as head coach.

On March 29, 2016, the Islanders set a new QMJHL record for most shots on goal in one period of a playoff game with 32. The previous record was 30, shared by four teams.

On June 4, 2016, the Charlottetown Islanders hosted the 2016 QMJHL Draft, after doing the same thing back in 2006 when they were named the P.E.I. Rocket.

On April 13, 2017, the Islanders advanced to the third round of the playoffs for the first time in franchise history, eliminating the Cape Breton Screaming Eagles four games to none in the second round.

On May 30, 2022, the Islanders won their third round series to make their first-ever franchise appearance in the President's Cup Final. This also marked the fourth time in the previous five playoffs that they reached the third round.

Players

Retired numbers
9 Maurice Richard Montreal Rocket
22 Pierre-André Bureau P.E.I. Rocket (2000–2005)

NHL alumni

 Antoine Bibeau
 Samuel Blais
 Guillaume Brisebois
 Filip Chlapik
 Ryane Clowe
 Josh Currie
 Marc-André Gragnani
 Ryan Graves
 Ross Johnston
 Pierre-Olivier Joseph
 David Laliberté
 Maxim Lapierre
 Pascal Leclaire
 Andrej Nestrasil
 Daniel Sprong

Team captains
 1999–2000 Edo Terglav (42 games); Francis Emery (15 games); Yann Joseph (9 games)
 2000–01 Edo Terglav (70 games); Michael Lambert (1 game); Jordan Trew (1 game); Jean-Michel Boisvert (1 game)
 2001–02 Marc Villeneuve
 2002–03 Pierre-André Bureau
 2003–04 Pierre-André Bureau
 2004–05 Maxim Lapierre
 2005–06 David Laliberté
 2006–07 David Laliberté (67 games); Marc-André Gragnani (1 game)
 2007–08 Pierre-Luc Lessard (37 games); Bryan Main (21 games); Geoff Walker (8 games); Matthew Lachaine (5 games)
 2008–09 Matthew Lachaine (27 games); Maxime Provencher (25 games); Joël Champagne (16 games)
 2009–10 Jean-Philippe Mathieu
 2010–11 Travis McIsaac
 2011–12 Matthew Hobbs, Josh Currie
 2012–13 Josh Currie
 2013–14 Jack Nevins (41 games)
 2014–15 Ryan MacKinnon
 2015–16 Quinn O'Brien, Oliver Cooper
 2016–17 Guillaume Brisebois
 2017–18 Pierre-Olivier Joseph
 2019–20 Brendan Clavelle
 2020–present Brett Budgell

Yearly results

Regular season
Legend: OTL = Overtime loss, SL = Shootout loss

Playoffs

See also
List of ice hockey teams in Prince Edward Island

References

External links
 
 QMJHL Arena Guide profile 

1999 establishments in Prince Edward Island
Ice hockey teams in Prince Edward Island
Ice hockey clubs established in 1999
Quebec Major Junior Hockey League teams
Sport in Charlottetown